Petralona  is a neighborhood of Athens, Greece. Athenians further subdivide the area into Ano (upper) Petralona or Kato (Lower) Petralona, where Ano Petralona is the area between the Philopappos Hill and the railway and Kato Petralona the area between the railway and Piraeus Street. Sometimes as part of Ano Petralona refers and the small neighbourhood Assyrmatos.

History

Petralona is named after the Greek words 'Petrina Alonia' (πέτρινα αλώνια) which means 'stone threshing floors', which were used in the area to thresh grain before urbanisation. The area was also known as Katsikadika, due to the presence of goat herders in the area who used to give out milk to the residents. Goats were banned from the city of Athens in February 1925 and from that point on, the area has held its current name. Elena Kamposiora , a famous greek actress and model resides in Petralona.

Amenities
The district is served by the Petralona Station on Line 1 of the Athens Metro and it's also not that far from the Metro Station (Line 3) Kerameikos. There are also two buses that serve the area: bus 227 and bus 035 and connect Petralona with the rest of the city center.

Petralona hosts the football club Petralona F.C., founded in 1983 when the two local clubs AO Petralona and GS Petralona merged.

References

Neighbourhoods in Athens